Michael Graves (1934–2015) was an American architect.

Michael Graves may also refer to:
 Michael Graves (audio engineer) (born 1968), American audio engineer
 Michael Graves (poker player) (born 1984), American poker player
 Michale Graves (born 1975), American punk rock vocalist
 Michael Graves (fighter) (born 1991), American martial artist